Chaerocina meridionalis is a moth of the family Sphingidae. It is known from highland forests in southern Tanzania and Malawi.

It is similar to Chaerocina dohertyi, but the black band of the hindwing is displaced towards the margin, leaving only a very narrow pink terminal fringe, which is broader and always reaches the apex.

References

Chaerocina
Moths described in 1968